Heppnerographa lapilla is a species of moth of the family Tortricidae. It is found in Brazil.

The wingspan is about 11 mm. The ground colour of the forewings is ochreous orange, suffused with black from the base to two thirds of the wing. There are some cream markings. The hindwings are brownish grey.

References

Moths described in 1999
Heppnerographa